Danilo Pereira da Silva (born 7 April 1999) is a Brazilian professional footballer who plays as a striker for Eredivisie club Feyenoord.

Club career

Ajax
Born in São Paulo, Danilo represented Portuguesa, Corinthians, Ponte Preta and Vasco da Gama as a youth before switching to the academy of Santos in 2016. On 7 September 2017, he signed with Dutch club AFC Ajax after agreeing to a five-year deal. He was assigned to the Jong Ajax (the reserve team) and Ajax under-19.

On 25 March 2018, Danilo made his debut for Jong Ajax in a 1–0 defeat against Jong AZ. He scored his first goal for Jong Ajax on 10 September 2018 in the game, in Alkmaar, against Jong AZ.

Twente (loan)
On 14 August 2020, Danilo joined fellow Eredivisie side Twente on a season-long loan deal.

On 20 January 2022, he scored four goals for Ajax in the round of 16 of the KNVB Cup against Excelsior Maassluis winning 9–0 at home.

Feyenoord
On 19 May 2022, Feyenoord announced that Danilo would sign a four-year contract with the club. He made his debut for the club on 7 August 2022, scoring the club's second and fourth goals in a 5–2 away win against Vitesse.

Career statistics

Honours
Jong Ajax
 Eerste Divisie: 2017–18

Ajax
 Eredivisie: 2021–22

Individual
 Eredivisie Talent of the month: October 2020

References

External links

1999 births
Living people
Footballers from São Paulo
Brazilian footballers
Brazilian expatriate footballers
Association football forwards
Jong Ajax players
AFC Ajax players
FC Twente players
Feyenoord players
Eredivisie players
Eerste Divisie players
Brazilian expatriate sportspeople in the Netherlands
Expatriate footballers in the Netherlands